The Roman Catholic Diocese of Leopoldina is a diocese located in the city of Leopoldina in the Ecclesiastical province of Juiz de Fora in Brazil.

History
 March 8, 1942: Established as Diocese of Leopoldina from the Diocese of Juiz de Fora and Metropolitan Archdiocese of Mariana

Bishops
 Edson José Oriolo dos Santos (30 October 2019)
 José Eudes Campos do Nascimento (2012.06.27 - 2018.12.12), appointed Bishop of São João del Rei, Minas Gerais
 Dario Campos, O.F.M. (2004.06.23 – 2011.04.27), appointed Bishop of Cachoeiro do Itapemirim, Espirito Santo; future Archbishop
 Célio de Oliveira Goulart, O.F.M. (1998.06.24 – 2003.07.09), appointed Bishop of Cachoeiro do Itapemirim, Espirito Santo
 Ricardo Pedro Chaves Pinto Filho, O. Praem. (1990.03.14 – 1996.10.16), appointed Archbishop of Pouso Alegre, Minas Gerais
 Sebastião Roque Rabelo Mendes (1985.08.05 – 1989.05.10)
 Geraldo Ferreira Reis (1961.06.16 – 1985.08.05)
 Delfim Ribeiro Guedes (1943.06.26 – 1960.07.23), appointed Bishop of São João del Rei, Minas Gerais

References

 GCatholic.org
 Catholic Hierarchy

Roman Catholic dioceses in Brazil
Christian organizations established in 1942
Leopoldina, Roman Catholic Diocese of
Roman Catholic dioceses and prelatures established in the 20th century
1942 establishments in Brazil